Robert McAuliffe (10 March 1939 – 24 May 2005) was a sports shooter from the United States Virgin Islands. He competed in the 25 metre pistol event at the 1972 Summer Olympics.

References

1939 births
2005 deaths
United States Virgin Islands male sport shooters
Olympic shooters of the United States Virgin Islands
Shooters at the 1972 Summer Olympics